The University Athletic Association of the Philippines (UAAP) volleyball tournament is divided into four divisions, namely men's, women's, boys' and girls'. Volleyball is a mandatory sport in the women's division. The UAAP volleyball tournament was held in the first semester of the school year until the UAAP Board decided to move it to the second semester in Season 69 (school year 2006–2007). This decision was made so that the games can be televised to improve its popularity.

Tournament format
The tournament begins with a double round robin group stage, where a team meets its opponent twice in a season. A semi-finals round composed of the top four teams follows, after which the top two teams meet in a best-of-three series Finals.

In the semi-Finals, the top four teams based on team standings (and tie-breakers, if applicable) from the group stage battle for a Finals slot. The two top seeds have a twice-to-beat advantage, that is they must be beaten twice in order to be eliminated. The lower seeds, on the other hand, are eliminated when they are defeated once. The surviving teams face off in a best-of-three Finals, where the team which notches two wins wins the championship.

If a team wins all of the games in the group stage, the step ladder format is used, where the unbeaten team has a bye to the Finals. The third and fourth seed will figure in a knockout game; the winner of that game will face the second seed which has a twice-to-beat advantage. The surviving team meets the first seed team in the Finals. From 2012 to 2015, the first seed team holds a thrice-to-beat advantage (or an automatic 1–0 lead in a best-of-five Finals) for sweeping the group stage. Starting 2016, all volleyball Finals series will be a best-of-three affair, but the rest of the regular and step ladder semi-Finals formats will remain in place.

List of volleyball champions

Early years
The UAAP founded by FEU, NU, UP and UST in 1938.

First expansion
Adamson, MCU, UM and UE added; only Adamson and UE were retained.

Second expansion
Ateneo was accepted as a member in 1978.

Third expansion
La Salle was accepted as a member in 1986.

Final Four era
Current tournament format introduced. Tournament for juniors' division are added on the second year of implementation of Final Four.

Number of championships by school

 Note

Statistics (Final Four Era)
Longest Finals appearance streaks:
Boys'
University of the East (16): Season 63 (2000) - Season 78 (2015)
Girls'
University of the East (9): Season 66 (2003) - Season 74 (2011)
University of Santo Tomas (9): Season 64 (2001) - Season 72 (2009)
Men's
University of Santo Tomas (9): Season 57 (1994) - Season 65 (2002)
Women's
De La Salle University (10): Season 71 (2009) - Season 80 (2018)
Longest Finals matchup appearance streaks:
Boys'
De La Salle University vs. University of Santo Tomas (3): Season 60 (1997) - Season 62 (1999)
University of the East vs. University of Santo Tomas (3): Season 72 (2009) - Season 74 (2011)
Girls'
De La Salle University vs. University of Santo Tomas (7): Season 66 (2003) - Season 72 (2009)
Men's
Far Eastern University vs. University of Santo Tomas (5): Season 59 (1996) - Season 63 (2000)
Ateneo de Manila University vs. National University (5): Season 76 (2014) - Season 80 (2018)
Women's
Ateneo de Manila University vs. De La Salle University (6): Season 74 (2012) - Season 79 (2017)
Longest Final Four appearance streaks:
Boys'
University of the East (22): Season 58 (1995) - Season 79 (2016)
Girls'
University of Santo Tomas (15): Season 64 (2001) - Season 79 (2016)
Men's
Far Eastern University (15): Season 56 (1993) - Season 70 (2008)
Women's
Far Eastern University (16): Season 56 (1993) - Season 71 (2009)
Longest Final Four appearance drought:
Boys'
University of the Philippines (9): Season 60 (1997) - Season 68 (2005), Season 70 (2007) - Season 78 (2015)
Girls'
National University (4): Season 57 (1994) - Season 60 (1997)
University of the Philippines (4): Season 75 (2012) - Season 78 (2015)
Men's
University of the East (23): Season 56 (1993) - Season 78 (2016)
Women's
National University (18): Season 56 (1993) - Season 74 (2011)
Longest championship streaks:
Boys'
University of the East (11):  Season 67 (2004) - Season 77 (2015)
Girls'
De La Salle University (5): Season 57 (1994) - Season 61 (1998)
Men's
University of Santo Tomas (4):  Season 70 (2008) - Season 73 (2011)
Women's
De La Salle University (3):  Season 66 (2003) - Season 68 (2005), Season 73 (2011) - Season 75 (2013), Season 78 (2016) - Season 80 (2018)
Far Eastern University (3): Season 63 (2000) - Season 65 (2002)
Longest single-season winning streaks (no losses within a season):
Men's
University of Santo Tomas (17-0): Perfect Season in Season 71
Ateneo de Manila University (16-0): Perfect Season in Season 79
Women's
Ateneo de Manila University (16-0): Perfect Season in Season 77
National University (16-0): Perfect Season in Season 84
Longest winning streaks (by games or covered seasons):
Men's
University of Santo Tomas (30 games, 2 seasons): 13 (5th game in group stage to Finals) in Season 72 + 17 (entire season) in Season 73
Ateneo de Manila University (30 games, 2 seasons): 14 (4th game in group stage to Finals) in Season 78 + 16 (entire season) in Season 79
Women's
De La Salle University (30 games, 2 seasons): 16 (2nd game in group stage to Finals) in Season 75 + 14 (group stage) in Season 76
Ateneo de Manila University (24 games, 3 seasons): 2 (last 2 games of Finals) in Season 76 + 16 (entire season) in Season 77 + 6 (first 6 games of group stage) in Season 78
National University (20 games, 3 seasons): 2 (only 2 games of group stage) in Season 82 + no tournament in Season 83 + 16 (entire season) in Season 84 + 2 (first 2 games of group stage) in Season 85
Most Games Played in a Season:
Men's
University of Santo Tomas (19): 14 (group stage) + 2 (Regular Final Four) + 3 (Finals) in Season 70
Women's
Ateneo de Manila University (21): 14 (group stage) + 3 (Stepladder Final Four) + 4 (Finals) in Season 76
 Elimination sweeps

Special awards

Most valuable players

Rookie of the Year

Individual awards

Men's Division

Women's Division

Boys' Division

Girls' Division

Final Four
The Final Four for Volleyball was instituted in Season 56 (1993–94). That year, the UAAP declared that there will be a Final Four in all mandatory sports. In 2004, there was no Final Four since the DLSU Lady Spikers swept the double round-rbin and were awarded the championship outright, becoming the only volleyball varsity team in the UAAP to win the championship outright with a 14-0 group stage sweep record. In 2007, following the loss of the UE Red Warriors to the DLSU Green Archers in the Finals series of the UAAP Season 70 basketball tournament despite UE's group stage sweep, the UAAP Final Four format was modified for elimination sweep cases.

The stepladder format was introduced beginning 2008 for all UAAP sports. Until 2015, in the earlier stepladder format, the no. 1 seed team was automatically qualified to a Finals berth with a thrice-to-beat incentive (and thus reformatting the best-of-three series to a 1-0 incentive lead in a best-of-five series). The other three teams in the top four rankings underwent play-off games to determine which will qualify for a Finals berth. Starting 2016, the thrice-to-beat incentive was removed, reverting to a best-of-three championship series for all sporting events in the UAAP (except football, which is a single-game UAAP championship match). Other Final Four rules still remain in place.

The UST men's volleyball team's 14-0 perfect group stage record in 2009 was the first to be recorded in UAAP history, but they played based on the regular Final Four format, becoming the only UAAP varsity team to achieve a perfect 17–0 season sweep record. , the UST Growling Tigers, DLSU Lady Spikers, the ADMU Blue Eagles and Lady Eagles, and the NU Lady Bulldogs achieved the 14-0 elimination sweeps record in the Final Four era of the UAAP collegiate volleyball. DLSU is currently the only school in UAAP collegiate volleyball history to complete multiple season-long elimination sweeps within the 2008–present form of the Final Four era, with the Lady Spikers having achieved it twice and currently holding the longest ongoing appearance in the Final Four of UAAP volleyball (since 2009).

In 2014 and 2015, ADMU emerged as the lowest Final Four-seeded volleyball team to ever win the UAAP championship (where they played through the stepladder playoffs format and won over 5 knockout games) as well as the first volleyball varsity team in UAAP history to both win the championship and achieve a perfect 16–0 season sweeps record (from group stage playoffs to championship series), respectively. ADMU also remains the only UAAP collegiate team to achieve both the 14-0 group stage and 16–0 season sweeps records for both men's and women's volleyball teams (each at least once), after the former achieved this feat in 2017. In 2022, NU became the first volleyball varsity team in the UAAP since the COVID-19 pandemic to both win the championship and achieve a perfect 16–0 season sweeps record after ending their 65-year volleyball championship drought in the women's division.
UAAP Men's Volleyball Game Archives
UAAP Women's Volleyball Game Archives

Season rankings 
The volleyball tournaments in Juniors' division started in Season 57 (1994–1995). The number of schools participating in the girls' division increased to six in Season 76 (2013–14) when Adamson University fielded a team. In Season 77 (2014–15), the number of schools participating in the boys' and girls' divisions increased to seven each as FEU fielded a team in both divisions.

Below are rankings per division per team in the Final Four era:

Men's division

Women's division

Boys' division

Girls' division

See also 

 NCAA Volleyball Championship
 Premier Volleyball League

References

External links
Rappler: Ateneo upsets De La Salle, wins first UAAP volleyball crown
GoArchers.com :Support Site of the De La Salle Lady Spikers
UAAP Volleyball at Spikeithard.com
WebArchive: UAAP Championship Scoreboard at www.uaapgames.com
WebArchive: UAAP Season 59 hosted by DLSU-Manila
WebArchive: The Official Website of the UAAP 61st Season, hosted by UE
WebArchive: UAAP Season 61: UAAP Champions 1938-1997
UST KEEPS UAAP WOMEN'S VOLLEYBALL CROWN - Sept. 20, 1997
www.rpspikers.tk :The Most Active Volleyball Forum in the Philippines
www.vleague.tk :Celebrating 6ix Years Of Serving Philippine Volleyball

Volleyball
College men's volleyball tournaments in the Philippines
College women's volleyball tournaments in the Philippines
Volleyball competitions in the Philippines